Roy Franklin Corley (November 1, 1874 – April 4, 1953) was an American politician who served as the ninth Lieutenant Governor of Delaware, from January 17, 1933, to January 19, 1937, under Governor C. Douglass Buck. He was a member of the Republican Party. As Lieutenant Governor he presided over the Delaware Senate.

External links
 Delaware's Lieutenant Governors

Lieutenant Governors of Delaware
1874 births
1953 deaths